Tatsuhiko (written:  or  or ) is a masculine Japanese given name. Notable people with the name include:

, Japanese golfer
, Japanese baseball player
, Japanese footballer
, Japanese footballer
, Japanese footballer
, pen name of Shibusawa Tatsuo, Japanese writer, literary critic and translator
, Japanese golfer
, Japanese writer
Tatsuhiko Kanaoka, Japanese artist known by his pen name Falcoon

Japanese masculine given names